Robert Hiltzik (born ) is the director of the 1983 summer camp slasher film, Sleepaway Camp, which attracted a cult following.

Hiltzik graduated from Williams College and continued to NYU's Tisch School of the Arts for film and then attended Hofstra University Law School. He now works as a partner in a New York City law firm.

Hiltzik did not know that his film had gained such a devoted following over the years, until he was contacted in March 2000 by Sleepawaycampmovies.com's Jeff Hayes, who arranged for him to record a commentary for the film's Anchor Bay Entertainment DVD. After a number of sequels directed and written by others, Hiltzik returned to write and direct a 2003 sequel, Return to Sleepaway Camp. He decided that this newest chapter would ignore the storylines of the other sequels, saying that he wanted to pick up where the original film had ended. The production was stopped for some time (according to Fangoria.com, the digital effects were being redone) before being released in 2008 as a direct-to-video sequel. Hiltzik has directed no other films.

External links

1957 births
Living people
American people of Polish descent
Horror film directors
Maurice A. Deane School of Law alumni
New York (state) lawyers
Tisch School of the Arts alumni
Williams College alumni